Churchville station is a former train station in Churchville, Pennsylvania. Located on Knowles Avenue and Bustleton Pike, it is now a private residence.

The station was built in 1892, and served as a stop on the Reading Railroad's Newtown Line. It replaced another structure built in 1878. It was later taken over by SEPTA and served as a stop on the Fox Chase/Newtown Line.

History
The station, built in 1892, was a stop on the Reading Railroad's Newtown Line, and a replacement for another structure built in 1878. It was later taken over by SEPTA and served as a stop on the Fox Chase/Newtown Line.

Churchville station, and all of those north of Fox Chase station, was closed on January 18, 1983 due to failing diesel train equipment resulting in low ridership.

In addition, a labor dispute began within the SEPTA organization when the transit operator inherited 1,700 displaced employees from Conrail. SEPTA insisted on utilizing transit operators from the Broad Street Subway to operate Fox Chase-Newtown diesel trains, while Conrail requested that railroad engineers run the service. When a federal court ruled that SEPTA had to use Conrail employees in order to offer job assurance, SEPTA cancelled Fox Chase-Newtown trains. Service in the diesel-only territory north of Fox Chase was cancelled at that time, and Churchville station still appears in publicly posted tariffs.

Although rail service was initially replaced with a Fox Chase-Newtown shuttle bus, patronage remained light, and the Fox Chase-Newtown shuttle bus service ended in 1999.

Station building
Churchville station has been restored and is now used as a private residence. SEPTA signage—installed in 1984, one year after train service had ended—remains in place at the station parking lot. The station is a contributing property of the Churchville Historic District, which has been listed on the National Register of Historic Places since July 21, 1995.

References

External links
Newtown Line.pa-tec.org – PA-TEC study on resuming SEPTA commuter service between Fox Chase and Newtown

Railway stations in the United States opened in 1878
Railway stations closed in 1983
1878 establishments in Pennsylvania
1983 disestablishments in Pennsylvania
Former SEPTA Regional Rail stations
Former Reading Company stations
Railway stations on the National Register of Historic Places in Pennsylvania
Former railway stations in Bucks County, Pennsylvania
Historic district contributing properties in Pennsylvania
National Register of Historic Places in Bucks County, Pennsylvania
National Register of Historic Places in Berks County, Pennsylvania